The compendium of protein lysine acetylation (CPLA) database contains the sites of experimentally identified lysine acetylation sites.

References

External links
 https://web.archive.org/web/20110725073836/http://cpla.biocuckoo.org/

Biological databases
Proteins
Post-translational modification